Poseidon (A-12) was a salvage and support vessel for submarines of the Spanish Navy, ceded in 2000 to Mauritania where it served with the name Voum-Legleita (B-551) until its sinking in February 2011.

References

1964 ships
Ships of the Spanish Navy